Lufthansa Regional is an operational entity for regional and feeder flights performed by two regional airlines owned by Lufthansa within its route network. As part of Lufthansa's rebranding, the Lufthansa Regional brand name has gradually been removed from the public eye since early 2018.

Overview 

Lufthansa Regional was founded as the successor of similar Team Lufthansa, which consisted of predominantly independent airlines contracted by Lufthansa. As of January 2018, Lufthansa Regional consists of two members, Air Dolomiti and Lufthansa CityLine, which are both fully owned by Lufthansa. They are based at Lufthansa's hubs at Frankfurt Airport and Munich Airport and carry 10.5 million passengers a year mostly to minor domestic and European destinations.

As part of Lufthansa's new corporate design introduced in early 2018, Lufthansa Regional aircraft operated by Lufthansa CityLine are also receiving the new livery, with the Lufthansa Regional titles being removed from the fuselage and replaced by Lufthansa.

As of March 2020, one sole route remained as operated by Air Dolomiti under the Lufthansa brand while all other of their operations are codeshared using their own brand name.

Member airlines

Current members 
Lufthansa Regional flights are operated by two partner airlines based at Lufthansa's hub airports in Frankfurt and Munich:

 Air Dolomiti (also operates some routes under their own brand)
 Lufthansa CityLine

Former members 
 Augsburg Airways (ceased operations by October 2013 as the contract with Lufthansa wasn't renewed)

 Contact Air (ceased operations by October 2012 as the contract with Lufthansa wasn't renewed, remaining assets taken over by now defunct OLT Express Germany)

 Eurowings (until 25 October 2014 when Eurowings started flying exclusively on behalf of Germanwings)

Fleet 
As of December 2022, the combined fleet of both airlines operating for Lufthansa Regional consists of the following aircraft:

References

External links 
Official website

Lufthansa